Matt's Million was a children's programme broadcast in 1996 on CiTV. It was written by author Andrew Norriss who had created many children's shows such as Bernard's Watch and Woof!.  It starred Peter England as Matt and Claire Parfitt as Claire. Only four episodes were produced. Windsor Davies also appeared, as did Alan Halsall, who later become famous for his role as Tyrone Dobbs in Coronation Street.

Synopsis 
The story was about a boy called Matt Collins, who became a millionaire at the age of 11.  After developing a successful computer game, which sold heavily in the Far East, Matt receives a cheque for just over £1.25 million from his family solicitors. Upon the initial reaction of shock, Matt carefully purchases some select goods, namely two bikes and a rented Rolls-Royce, driven by his own personal chauffeur, Henry. As the series progresses, he later discovers money makes life harder than you think.

References

External links 
 Andrew Norriss' website
 Andrew Norriss' article on Matt's Million
 Internet Movie Database Entry

1996 British television series debuts
1996 British television series endings
1990s British children's television series
ITV children's television shows
ITV television dramas
1990s British television miniseries
Television series by ITV Studios
Carlton Television
English-language television shows